The 2001–02 Club Atlético Osasuna season was the club's 82nd season in existence and the club's second consecutive season in the top flight of Spanish football. In addition to the domestic league, Osasuna participated in this season's edition of the Copa del Rey.

Players

Squad

Competitions

Overview

La Liga

League table

Results summary

Results by round

Matches

Copa del Rey

Notes

References

CA Osasuna seasons
CA Osasuna